Lene Alexandra Øien (born 29 October 1981 in Trøgstad, Norway) is a Norwegian singer, television personality and model.

History and career

2001–06: Career beginnings
Alexandra was a model for the FHM magazine as well for the Norwegian lad's mags Lek and Cats. At 19 she appeared on the Norwegian counterpart of popular show "Survivor". She made friends with the host who also has his own record label and offered to work at the label free without a salary as long as one day she might be able to make music with them.

2007–08: Welcome To Sillycone Valley and ESC 2008
After years of working at the record company, she began her musical career in 2007 at age 25 and released her first single entitled "My Boobs Are OK". The single charted in several European countries and broke the top 10 in Norway and Finland followed by her second single "Hot Boy, Hot Girl". In 2008, Alexandra released her debut album Welcome to Sillycone Valley and her third single "Sillycone Valley". She was an entrant in the Norwegian national selection for Eurovision Song Contest 2008, where she sang "Sillycone Valley". She made it to the second chance round where she ended up in 3rd place and missed a place in the finals. Alexandra's fourth and final single "Sexy, Naughty, Bitchy Me" from her debut album was originally recorded by Thai pop singer Tata Young titled "Sexy Naughty Bitchy" on her first English album I Believe. In November 2008 Alexandra won the fourth season of Skal vi danse?, the Norwegian version of Dancing with the Stars.

2009–11: ESC 2010 and other ventures
She is now signed for Sony Music. She entered the national selection for Eurovision Song Contest 2010 with the song "Prima Donna" which ended up in one of the bottom two positions in the semi-final. In 2011, she is educated as personal trainer, and works for SATS in Storo. A new album was set for a release in autumn 2011.

2012–present: Try to Catch Me
In 2012, Alexandra is releasing a 5-track EP album called Try to Catch Me in which she uses more of a jazz sound rather than her previous dance/pop sound. The first single of the EP is the song of the same name.

Personal life
Alexandra speaks Norwegian as well as English and Swedish. She has done promotions in both Norwegian and English.

She and another woman claimed that they had sex with Robbie Williams, which she later has admitted was a lie. In 2005, Williams said about the two women, "You two are big liars. You are fine, and I would have slept with you." ["Dere to er store løgnere. Dere er flotte, og jeg ville ha ligget med dere"].

In 2013, she revealed that when she worked as a stripper, she had a habit of using amphetamine before she started her shifts.

Discography

Albums
 2008: Welcome to Sillycone Valley
 2012: Try to Catch Me (EP)

Singles
 2007: "My Boobs Are OK" No. 3 NOR
 2007: "Hot Boy, Hot Girl" No. 12 NOR
 2008: "Sillycone Valley" No. 17 NOR
 2008: "Sexy, Naughty, Bitchy Me" (Tata Young Cover)
 2010: "Prima Donna"
 2012: "Try to Catch Me"

Filmography
 2001: Survivor (as herself)
 2008: Skal vi danse? (as herself)

References

External links
 
Officiell webbplats

1981 births
Living people
Melodi Grand Prix contestants
People from Trøgstad
Norwegian female models
Norwegian erotic dancers
21st-century Norwegian singers
21st-century Norwegian women singers